The Frauen-Bundesliga 1993–94 was the 4th season of the Frauen-Bundesliga, Germany's premier football league. The top two clubs of northern division met in the final with TSV Siegen defeating Grün-Weiß Brauweiler 1–0. Both clubs had already met in the cup final five weeks earlier, but then Brauweiler had prevailed. The championship was Siegen's fifth.

Northern conference

Standings

Results

Southern conference

Standings

Results

Semi-finals

Final

Top scorers

Qualification

Group North

Group South 1

Group South 2

References

1993-94
Ger
1
Women